René Taelman (5 May 1945 – 13 August 2019) was a Belgian football manager.

Career 
Taelman managed Burkina Faso (2000 African Cup of Nations), Benin, Cercle Brugge K.S.V., JS Kabylie (2005) and Akhdar in the Libyan Premier League.

References

1945 births
2019 deaths
Belgian football managers
Cercle Brugge K.S.V. managers
Expatriate football managers in Algeria
JS Kabylie managers
2000 African Cup of Nations managers